"Big Eye" Louis Nelson Delisle (January 28, 1885 – August 20, 1949) was an American early twentieth-century Dixieland jazz clarinetist in New Orleans, Louisiana, United States. He also played double bass, banjo, and accordion.

Early life and education
Nelson Delisle was born into a family who were Creoles of color. He spent most of his life in New Orleans, Louisiana. He studied clarinet with the elder Lorenzo Tio.

Career
By the age of 15, Delisle was working professionally in the music venues of Storyville, an area of brothels and clubs in New Orleans. He developed a style of hot jazz, a.k.a. Dixieland, and was an influence on clarinetists Johnny Dodds and Jimmie Noone.

Early in his career Delisle often played a C clarinet, as opposed to the more common B♭; the C was used by other New Orleans clarinetists of the era, such as Alcide Nunez.

In 1917, Delisle joined the reconstituted Original Creole Orchestra that included Freddie Keppard and Bill Johnson. The band had disbanded in Boston in the spring of that year but was reassembled in New York City in the fall of the same year. Delisle replaced George Baquet, who had toured with the group in vaudeville. After a short while, Delisle was replaced by Jimmie Noone. He was the regular clarinetist with the Jones & Collins Astoria Hot Eight but did not play on their 1929 recording sessions.

He made his only recordings in his later years in the 1940s, by which time he was often in poor health.

References

1885 births
1949 deaths
American accordionists
American jazz banjoists
American jazz double-bassists
Male double-bassists
Dixieland clarinetists
Jazz musicians from New Orleans
20th-century accordionists
20th-century double-bassists
20th-century American male musicians
American male jazz musicians
Jones & Collins Astoria Hot Eight members
20th-century African-American musicians